Quicker Than the Eye (1996 Avon Books) is a collection of short stories by American writer Ray Bradbury.

Contents
 "Unterderseaboat Doktor", which features, as a psychiatrist, a former submarine captain in Hitler's undersea fleet, making connections between sub-marine and sub-conscious.
 "Zaharoff/Richter Mark V", a speculation on why so many major cities are in such dangerous locales.
 "Remember Sascha?"
 "Another Fine Mess", a homage to Laurel and Hardy; a sequel to "The Laurel and Hardy Love Affair".
 "The Electrocution"
 "Hopscotch"
 "The Finnegan", a tall tale in a Victorian mood.
 "That Woman on the Lawn, a  tangential episode in the same "universe" as Something Wicked This Way Comes
 "The Very Gentle Murders", a fantasy of marital strife
 "Quicker Than the Eye", which visits another carnival act.
 "Dorian In Excelsis", which pays homage to Oscar Wilde's The Picture of Dorian Gray
 "No News, Or What Killed the Dog?"
 "The Witch Door"
 "The Ghost in the Machine"
 "At the End Of the Ninth Year"
 "Bug"
 "Once More, Legato"
 "Exchange"
 "Free Dirt"
 "Last Rites"
 "The Other Highway"
 "Make Haste To Live: An Afterword", in which the author writes of writing and the back-stories of some of the stories in this collection.

References

External links
 

1996 short story collections
Short story collections by Ray Bradbury
Short fiction about time travel
Avon (publisher) books